The 1950–51 Honduran Amateur League was the fourth edition of the Honduran Amateur League.  F.C. Motagua obtained its 2nd national title.  The season ran from 9 September 1950 to 23 January 1951.

Regional champions
For the first time the department of Yoro included a team to participate for the national championship.

Known results

National championship round
Played in a single round-robin format in Tegucigalpa between the regional champions.  Also known as the Cuadrangular.

Known results

Motagua's lineup

References

Liga Amateur de Honduras seasons
Honduras
1950 in Honduras
1951 in Honduras